The William H. Natcher Green River Parkway was the designation for a  freeway that ran from Bowling Green to Owensboro in the US commonwealth of Kentucky. The Natcher Parkway was one of nine highways that were a part of Kentucky's parkway system. The portion north of Interstate 65 (I-65) was signed as I-165, and the portion south of I-65 as Kentucky Route 9007 (KY 9007) on March 6, 2019.

Route description
The parkway began at an interchange with US Route 231 (US 231) south of I-65 (exit 20) near Bowling Green. It traveled along the west side of the city in a northwesterly direction, through rolling farmlands and near coal mines, for  before meeting its northern terminus at an interchange with US 60 in Owensboro. At exit 43, the parkway intersected with the Wendell H. Ford Western Kentucky Parkway. The Natcher Parkway bypassed the cities of Morgantown, Beaver Dam and Hartford. The parkway carried the unsigned designation of Kentucky Route 9007 (WN 9007).

History

Conceived as the "Owensboro–Bowling Green Parkway." it was instead named the Green River Parkway when it opened on December 15, 1972. It was renamed William H. Natcher Parkway in 1994 following the death of William H. Natcher, a United States Congressman who represented the Second District of Kentucky for three decades. Natcher is best known for his record-setting string of 18,401 roll call votes, even being wheeled in on a hospital gurney to vote shortly before his death.

Glen Lily overpass 
In 1973, the Glen Lily Road (KY 2665) overpass over the parkway was awarded the title of "Most Beautiful Bridge" by the American Institute of Steel Construction in the Highway Grade Separation category.

Additional interchange and name combinations
The first added interchange built for the Natcher Parkway was the KY 70 interchange (exit 27, later exit 29) near Morgantown. Constructed in the 1999-2000 fiscal year, it was built to provide access to the city's industrial district.

In 2006, the old and new names were combined into the current name, in order to be consistent with most of the state's other parkways, all of which (except for the Audubon Parkway) had their original names changed in the same manner to honor various Kentucky politicians. However, the newly designed marker signs that were installed on the Natcher Parkway in mid-2006 did not bear the words "Green River".

Toll removal
On November 21, 2006, toll plazas on the Natcher were removed. State law requires that toll collection cease when enough tolls are collected to pay off the parkway's construction bonds. The Natcher and the nearby Audubon Parkway, were the last two roads in the Kentucky parkway system to have their tolls removed.

Prior to the removal of the tolls, toll plazas were located at exit 7 (later exit 9) in Bowling Green, exit 34 (later exit 36) in Cromwell–Morgantown, and exit 48 (later exit 50) in Hartford. Motorists traveling between the I-65 exit and exit 7/9 in the Bowling Green area were not charged a toll.

Natcher Parkway Extension 
In November 2011, the Natcher was extended by an additional  from I-65 southward to US 231 (Scottsville Road) on the south side of Bowling Green. This was done to provide some relief for traffic on Scottsville Road as that roadway is the busiest thoroughfare in the city. The project also included a new interchange for KY 622 near Plano, at milepost one.

Interstate 66
The East–West Trans America Highway was proposed in the Intermodal Surface Transportation Efficiency Act of 1991 and was narrowed down to the I-66 Southern Kentucky Corridor in the National Highway System Designation Act of 1995:

The preferred I-66 route followed US 68 between Bowling Green and Hopkinsville, however the I-66 spur along the Natcher Parkway eventually entered the highway plans. The Kentucky Transportation Cabinet (KYTC) finished its feasibility study of the I-66 project in 2005 and concluded that I-66 was not cost beneficial for the foreseeable future to justify its construction or any further study, thereby cancelling the state of Kentucky's participation in the I-66 project. The only remaining study of I-66 was conducted by the Federal Highway Administration (FHWA) and the Illinois Department of Transportation (IDOT) under the 66 Corridor Study, a Tier 1 Environmental Impact Study. This study was cancelled August 6, 2015, by IDOT and subsequently the FHWA announced the cancellation of the Tier 1 Environmental Impact Study in the Federal Register, ending the last I-66 project and therefore officially cancelling the I-66 Trans America Highway.

Decommissioning
The William H. Natcher Parkway designation was decommissioned in favor of a new Interstate Highway number along most of its length. I-165 is the designation north of I-65, while Kentucky Route 9007 (KY 9007) is the designation of the parkway south of it. In early 2016, funding was set aside to rebuild and restore sections of the parkway to Interstate Highway standards. From July to August 2017, construction consisting of shoulder work, draining and repaving was completed. Additional work took place along the entirety of the parkway. In July 2018, major modernization upgrades began in the Warren County section, consisting of ramp extensions, guardrail replacement, LED lighting upgrades and bridge wall replacement. This work continued through the end of 2018. The US 231 interchange (exit 9) will be partially or completely revamped, and several interchange designs are being considered, including a dual-roundabout system. A new interchange will likely be constructed between the mile markers 3.4 and 4, allowing access to Elrod Road in Bowling Green.

The presumed number for the parkway was I-565, but on September 24, 2017, the American Association of State Highway and Transportation Officials' Special Committee on U.S. Route Numbering approved the Natcher Parkway as I-165 instead.

On September 5, 2018, it was announced that the entire parkway would be signed with I-165 shields by the end of 2019, even before completion of the parkway's upgrades, thus officially bringing it to Interstate status. After crews began posting the updated signage, the highway was officially designated I-165 on March 6, 2019. In 2018, Representative Suzanne Miles of Owensboro introduced a bill that would have given the highway an honorary designation of "William H. Natcher Expressway", but the bill did not make it out of committee.

Exit list

See also

References

 I-565 story

External links

Official Kentucky Transportation Cabinet website with information and toll schedules for the Natcher Parkway
KentuckyRoads.com — William H. Natcher Parkway
Exit Guide for Natcher Parkway

9007
Kentucky parkway system
Interstate 66
Interstate 69
Transportation in Butler County, Kentucky
Transportation in Daviess County, Kentucky
Transportation in Ohio County, Kentucky
Transportation in Warren County, Kentucky